Weathers is a surname, and may refer to:

Andre Weathers (born 1976), football player
Barbara Weathers (born 1963), R&B/soul singer
Beck Weathers (born 1946), pathologist 
Carl Weathers (born 1948), actor and football player
Casey Weathers (born 1985), baseball pitcher
Clarence Weathers (born 1962), football player
David Weathers (born 1969), baseball relief pitcher
Doug Weathers (born 1931), television journalist 
Felicia Weathers (born 1937), American opera soprano
John Weathers (born 1947), Welsh drummer
Lawrence Carthage Weathers (1890–1918), Australian recipient of the Victoria Cross
Michael Weathers (born 1997), American basketball player
Ryan Weathers (born 1999), American baseball player
William Weathers (1814–1895), English bishop

See also
Weather (disambiguation)
29198 Weathers, Main-belt Asteroid 
Weathers (band), American Rock band